De la Concorde station is an intermodal transit station in Laval, Quebec, Canada. It serves the Montreal Metro's Orange Line and connects to Exo's Saint-Jérôme commuter rail line. It is located in the Laval-des-Rapides district and opened April 28, 2007, as part of Montreal Metro's extension into Laval.

Description
The station is named after boulevard de la Concorde, which in turn is named for the Place de la Concorde in Paris. The entrance building is split-level, the lower providing access to the Metro station and the upper level to the train station, with the platforms continuing towards the walkway that goes under the rail bridge that crosses Boul. de la Concorde. This walkway is higher than the sidewalk. On the west side of the station, opposite the Metro station, stairs connect the sidewalk with the walkway.

Montreal Metro

The station is a side platform station, built in tunnel with an open-pit central section in the shape of a cube. The upper surface of the cube protrudes out of the earth and is rimmed with skylights, producing a sundial-like effect as the progress of the sun changes the light within the cube. The station's decor is primarily bare concrete, metal, and steel, with the platform's ultramarine tiles and enlarged photographs of grass providing colour.

The escalator shaft from the entrance building to the ticket hall also protrudes out of the earth as a glazed cylinder reminiscent of Norman Foster's fosterito metro entrances in the Bilbao metro. The entrance building is split-level, one level providing access to the station and the other to the train station; its glazed front is decorated with a large Metro logo.

The train station is located at an upper level and the platforms continue onto a viaduct over Boul. de la Concorde. Also at this level is a park and ride loop and bicycle trail access.

The area to the east of the station entrance is landscaped, with benches and a terrace provided on top of the station cube. The footpath leading to the station is the site of the station's artwork, Nos allers-retours (translation: our departures and returns) by Yves Gendreau. The sculpture is a series of tangled metal tubes, in the colours of the Metro lines plus purple for the commuter trains, atop a series of poles, representing the paths taken by the users of public transit.

Commuter rail

De La Concorde station is a commuter rail station operated by Exo in Laval, Quebec, Canada. It is served by  the Saint-Jérôme line.

The station replaced Saint-Martin station, a commuter rail station that had been  to the north, in order to be intermodal with the new Montreal Metro station, operated by the Société de transport de Montréal (STM).

Connecting bus routes
Although the station is intermodal with the Orange Line of the Montreal Metro, local bus services do not enter the station. The Société de transport de Laval (STL) bus routes 2, 33, 37 and 42 operate along the adjoining main thoroughfares of de la Concorde Boulevard West and Ampere Avenue.

References

External links

 De La Concorde Station - Official STM web page 
 Montreal by Metro, metrodemontreal.com
 2008 Current STL System Map 
 Pictures of the new Laval Metro - 
 STL 2011 map
 Interactive map of Laval
 Shows both the borders and names of the 14 former municipalities (purple) and the borders only of the current 6 sectors (maroon), tick off both boxes beside "Limite administrative".
 Metro Map
 STM 2011 System map

Accessible Montreal Metro stations
Exo commuter rail stations
Buildings and structures in Laval, Quebec
Orange Line (Montreal Metro)
Railway stations in Laval, Quebec
Railway stations in Canada opened in 2007
2007 establishments in Quebec
Transport in Laval, Quebec